Gomta railway station  is a railway station serving in Rajkot district of Gujarat State of India. It is under Bhavnagar railway division of Western Railway Zone of Indian Railways. Passenger, Express trains halt here.

Trains 

The following trains halt at Gomta railway station in both directions:

 19569/70 Rajkot - Veraval Express

References

Railway stations in Rajkot district
Bhavnagar railway division